Marian Plezia (born 1917 in Kraków, d. 1996) was a Polish historian. He was an expert in medieval Polish history and author of a Latin-Polish dictionary and a Medieval Latin-Polish dictionary.

Selected bibliography
 . Kraków: Polska Akademia 1946.
 . . Edited by Kumaniecki Kazimierz. Warszawa: 1951 pp. 271–287.
 Supplementary remarks on Aristotle in the ancient biographical tradition. Eos. 51: 241-249 (1961). 
 . Eos. 63: 37-42 (1975). 
 . Meander 36: 481-493 (1981). 
 . In: : Paul Moraux Gewidmet I. Edited by Wiesner Jürgen. Berlin: Walter De Gruyter 1985 pp. 1–11.
. Les Études Classiques 54: 383-385 (1986).

External links 

1917 births
1996 deaths
20th-century Polish historians
Polish male non-fiction writers
Polish classical philologists
Burials at Rakowicki Cemetery